Order Shall Prevail is the ninth studio album by American death metal band Jungle Rot, released through Victory Records on June 30, 2015.

Track listing

Personnel 
David Matrise: Guitars/Lead Vocals
James Genenz: Bass Guitar/Backing Vocals
Geoff Bub: Lead Guitar
Joey Muha: Drums
Chris "Wisco" Djuricic: Producer
Gyula Havancsak: Artwork & Design

References

2015 albums
Jungle Rot albums
Victory Records albums